Variations for Orchestra may refer to:
 an orchestral piece consisting of a set of variations, usually on a theme;
 Variations for Orchestra (1904) by Arnold Bax
 Variations for Orchestra, Op. 31 (1926–28) by Arnold Schoenberg
 Variations for Orchestra, Op. 30 (1940) by Anton Webern
 Variations for Orchestra (1954) by Luigi Dallapiccola
 Variations for Orchestra (1954–55) by Elliott Carter
 Variations for Orchestra (1956) by Henry Cowell
 Orchestral Variations (Copland) (1957) by Aaron Copland
 Variations for Orchestra  (1957/1960) by Ralph Vaughan Williams (originally composed as Variations for Brass Band and transcribed by Gordon Jacob)
 Variations: Aldous Huxley in memoriam (1963–64) by Igor Stravinsky
 Variations for Orchestra (1966) by Leslie Bassett
 Variations for Orchestra by Geoffrey Grey
 Variations for Orchestra, a ballet choreographed by George Balanchine to Stravinsky's 1964 composition

See also
 Symphonic Variations (disambiguation)
 Variations on a Theme (disambiguation)
 Variation (music)